The Court of the Archdeacon, or Archdeaconry Court, is an obsolete ecclesiastical court of the Church of England. The court's original responsibilities included trial for minor criminal matters falling within the territory of the archdeacon. Appeals against court decisions were made directly to the diocesan bishop. Archdeaconry Courts became redundant in the eighteenth century when the minor criminal jurisdiction passed to justices of the peace.

Church of England legislation
Ecclesiastical courts